Thelston Rodney O'Neale Payne (born 13 February 1957) is a former West Indian cricketer.

He played only one Test and seven One Day Internationals for the West Indies. He played first class cricket from 1978–79 to 1989–90, turning out in 68 first class matches - mostly for Barbados.

He was usually second choice to Jeff Dujon in the West Indies team, but got his Test chance in the 1985–86 series v England in West Indies as Dujon was injured. He held five catches in the West Indies' seven-wicket win, but scored only five runs.

In his seven ODIs, he was always in and out of the team, as he played only two successive matches - in the 1986–87 World Series Cup. That was his penultimate ODI - his final was against New Zealand two months later, during which he held a catch off Richard Hadlee's bat, but did not get to bat because Gordon Greenidge and Desmond Haynes wrapped up the target without losing a wicket.

External links 
 

1957 births
Living people
Barbados cricketers
West Indies One Day International cricketers
West Indies Test cricketers
Barbadian cricketers
Wicket-keepers